Ardozyga argocentra is a species of moth in the family Gelechiidae. It was described by Edward Meyrick in 1904. It is found in Australia, where it has been recorded from the state of Western Australia.

The forewings are fuscous, slightly purplish-tinged, irrorated (speckled) with dark fuscous and with the stigmata formed by white dots partially surrounded with dark fuscous, the plical larger, obliquely beyond the first discal. The posterior three-fifths of the costa is marked with a series of white dots. The hindwings are grey.

References

Ardozyga
Moths described in 1904
Taxa named by Edward Meyrick
Moths of Australia